Afreumenes violaceus is a species of wasp in the family Vespidae. It was described by Giordani Soika in 1941.

Subspecies
 Afreumenes violaceus violaceus (Giordani Soika, 1941)
 Afreumenes violaceus paramelanosoma Giordani Soika, 1968
 Afreumenes violaceus trifasciatus Giordani Soika, 1987
 Afreumenes violaceus rugosopunctatus Giordani Soika, 1968

References

Potter wasps
Insects described in 1941